Islamic university or Al-Jami'ah al-Islamiyyah is an educational institution.

Islamic university may refer specifically to:

Bangladesh 

 Islamic University, Bangladesh at Shantidanga, Kushtia.
 International Islamic University, Chittagong
 Islamic University of Technology in Bangladesh

Indonesia 
 Bandung Islamic University, West Java
 Islamic University of Indonesia, Special Region of Yogyakarta
 Universities named "State Islamic University"
 Alauddin Islamic State University, South Sulawesi
 Ar-Raniry State Islamic University, Aceh
 Maulana Malik Ibrahim State Islamic University Malang, East Java
 Raden Fatah State Islamic University, South Sumatra
 Sultan Syarif Kasim II State Islamic University, Aceh
 State Islamic University of North Sumatra, North Sumatra
 Sunan Ampel State Islamic University Surabaya, East Java
 Sunan Kalijaga State Islamic University, Special Region of Yogyakarta
 Syarif Hidayatullah State Islamic University Jakarta, Jakarta

Saudi Arabia 

 Islamic University of Madinah at Medina, Saudi Arabia
 Imam Muhammad ibn Saud Islamic University

Others 

 International Islamic University Malaysia
 Islamic University of Science and Technology in Jammu and Kashmir, India
Islamic University of Gaza, Afghanistan
International Islamic University, Islamabad, Pakistan
Mohi-ud-Din Islamic University
Islamic University College in Iraq
Omdurman Islamic University, Sudan
Russian Islamic University
Islamic University of Applied Sciences Rotterdam, Netherlands
Mohi-ud-Din Islamic University
Islamic University in Uganda

See also
International Islamic University (disambiguation)
Al-Jam'iyya al-Islamiyya (disambiguation)